Charles Holland Locke,  (September 16, 1887 – May 30, 1980) was a Canadian Justice of the Supreme Court of Canada.

Born in Morden, Manitoba, he served articles first with a law firm in Morden, then moved to Winnipeg to finish his articles in the office of Albert Hudson, who was later appointed to the Supreme Court.  Locke was called to the bar of Manitoba in 1910 but interrupted his legal practice to serve overseas with the Canadian military in World War I, being awarded the Military Cross.  After the War, he returned to practise in Winnipeg, but in 1928 he moved to Vancouver, joining the bar of British Columbia.

Locke was appointed to the Supreme Court of Canada on June 3, 1947, filling the vacancy caused by the death of his mentor, Albert Hudson. He was the first person born in western Canada to be appointed to the Supreme Court. He served as Puisne Justice until September 16, 1962.

In 1971, he was made a Companion of the Order of Canada.

Personal life
His son, Charles Conrad Locke (September 24, 1917–October 1, 2011), was a justice of both the Supreme Court of British Columbia and British Columbia Court of Appeal.

References

External links
 Supreme Court of Canada biography

Justices of the Supreme Court of Canada
Companions of the Order of Canada
Canadian recipients of the Military Cross
1887 births
1980 deaths
People from Morden, Manitoba